Haapavesi is a town and a municipality of Finland.

It is located in the North Ostrobothnia region. The name means "Aspen Water". Neighbour municipalities are Haapajärvi, Kärsämäki, Nivala, Oulainen, Raahe, Siikalatva and Ylivieska.

The municipality is unilingually Finnish.

The town is the Finnish national kantele village. It is also known for the Haapavesi Folk Music Festival which gathers folkmusicians together.

Haapavesi Folk High School 
The Haapavesi Folk High School is an ideologically independent boarding school. Haapavesi Folk High School is one of the eleven folk high schools cooperating in the HUMAK University of Applied Sciences.  HUMAK offers education and training in the fields of Civic and youth work, Cultural management and production as well as Sign language interpreter.  In  Haapavesi Unit of HUMAK the focus is on civic and youth work.

Notable individuals 
 Aappo Luomajoki, cross-country skier
 Aapo Heikkilä, investor
 Aarne Ehojoki, architect
 Ahti Pekkala, politician
 Aki Kangasharju, Nordea's chief economist
 Antti Rantonen, traditional kantele musician, father of mixed playing style
 Ari Nurkkala, Mayor of Hyrynsalmi
 Arvo Ojalehto, weightlifter 
 Edvard Vähäsarja, Jäger lieutenant
 Eeva Tojkander, poet
 Fanny Friman, poet
 Hannu Karjalainen, artist
 Hans Perttula, minister
 Juha Junno, ice hockey coach
 Juho Ritola, skier
 K.E. Sonck, translator, schoolteacher and writer
 Leevi Karsikas, writer
 Liisa Rentola, teacher and writer (lived in Haapavesi)
 Marko Ritola, sprinter
 Martti Pokela, folk musician and composer
 Matti Koskenkorva, cross-country skier
 Matti Luttinen, politician
 Matti Viinamaa, poet
 Nora Pöyhönen, horticulturist and school director
 Pasi Jääskeläinen, playwright, actor, singer and Kantele-player
 Pauliina Turakka Purhonen, artist
 Sami Niku, ice hockey player
 Sauli Rytky, cross-country skier
 Taavi Törmälehto, Mannerheim Cross knight
 Tapani Niku, cross-country skier
 Tuukka Veikkola, musician alias "Xtrullor"
 Teuvo Hatunen, skier
 Teuvo Karsikas, schoolteacher and writer
 Ville Mattila, cross-country skier and Olympic medalist
 Väinö Karihtala, writer
 Yrjö Komu, politician and Member of Parliament

References

External links

Town of Haapavesi – Official website
Haapavesi Folk Music Festival

 
Cities and towns in Finland
Populated places established in 1866
1866 establishments in the Russian Empire